Kim Ja-young (born 18 March 1991) is a South Korean professional golfer. Her name is sometimes translated as Kim Char-young. She plays on the LPGA of Korea Tour where she was won four times.

Professional wins (4)

LPGA of Korea Tour wins (4)

References

External links 

South Korean female golfers
LPGA of Korea Tour golfers
1991 births
Living people